Nyctimystes fluviatilis, also known as the Indonesian big-eyed tree frog, is a species of frog in the subfamily Pelodryadinae of the family Hylidae. It is endemic to New Guinea and is known from Idenburg River (its type locality) and Wapoga River in Papua province, Indonesia, and from the Torricelli Mountains in the East Sepik Province and Kavorabip in the Western Province, both in the western Papua New Guinea.

Description
The holotype, an adult female, measures  in snout–vent length. The snout is relatively flat and dorsoventrally compressed. The tympanum is visible; the supratympanic fold is weakly developed. The canthus rostralis is distinct. The outer fingers are about half-webbed, whereas the outer toes are webbed to the base of the discs. The preserved specimen is dorsally light brown with small (1–2 mm) scattered spots. The legs have some irregular crossbars. The lower surfaces are pale tan.

Habitat and conservation
Breeding probably occurs in torrential streams where the tadpoles develop.

The collection from the Torricelli mountains contains several specimens, whereas only two specimens are known from the Indonesian part of the range. The threats to this species are unknown.

References

fluviatilis
Endemic fauna of New Guinea
Amphibians of Papua New Guinea
Amphibians of Western New Guinea
Amphibians described in 1958
Taxa named by Richard G. Zweifel
Taxonomy articles created by Polbot